Lord Theobald Butler (24 August 1852 – 16 June 1929) was a British clergyman who was the youngest son of John Butler, 2nd Marquess of Ormonde and his wife, Frances Jane Paget. At the time of his birth, he was the fourth son of Lord and Lady Ormonde, and he was christened James Theobald Bagot John Butler. As a younger son of a marquess, he received the honorific prefix of Lord from birth.

He is historically significant as being one of the last male members of the ancient House of Ormonde (see Earl of Ormond). He was the brother of James Butler, 3rd Marquess of Ormonde and Arthur Butler, 4th Marquess of Ormonde, the uncle of George Butler, 5th Marquess of Ormonde and Arthur Butler, 6th Marquess of Ormonde, and the father of Charles Butler, 7th Marquess of Ormonde.

Life and marriage
He attended Cambridge University and was the Rector of Ulcombe, Kent, from 1898 to 1923. The living at Ulcombe was in the gift of Lord Ormonde, and upon Lord Theobald's retirement in 1923 was said to be worth £550 per year  In 1919, he was made the beneficiary of a £275 annual charge on the Ormonde Estates in the will of his eldest brother, James Butler, 3rd Marquess of Ormonde.

He married Annabella Gordon, daughter of clergyman Dr Cosmo Reid Gordon, and had five children:
 Walter Butler (James Walter Theobold Gordon Butler, born 19 May 1886, died 2 May 1945 without issue), who married Alice Theodora Aked in 1926.
 Violet Butler (Violet Mary Emily Maud Butler, born 22 April 1889, died 30 September 1973 with issue), who married Ronald Victor Okes Hart-Synnot in 1912.
 The Rev. Anthony Ronald Patrick Arthur Hart-Synnot
 Lilah Butler (Sybil Frances Christina Lilah Butler, born 10 February 1891, died 30 September 1970 without issue), who married her first cousin, Arthur Henry Francis Edwardes in 1913.
 Constance Butler (Victoria Blanche Constance Theodora Butler, born 28 September 1897, died 15 June 1952 with issue), who married Charles Bellville West in 1920.
 Bridget Annie Gordon (Bridget Annie West, formerly Bridget Jennings)
 Charles Butler, 7th Marquess of Ormonde (James Hubert Theobald Charles Butler, born 19 April 1899, died 25 October 1997 with issue), who married (1) Nan Gilpin in 1935 and (2) Elizabeth Rarden in 1976.
 The Lady Ann Soukup (Lady Constance Anne Butler)
 The Lady Cynthia Hammer (Lady Violet Cynthia Lilah Butler)

Lord Theobald performed the marriage ceremony of his brother Lord Arthur Butler (later Arthur Butler, 4th Marquess of Ormonde) and the Chicago Heiress Ellen Stager in 1887.

References

1852 births
1929 deaths
19th-century English Anglican priests
20th-century English Anglican priests
Younger sons of marquesses
People from Ulcombe